James Robert Van Fossen is a former Republican member of the Iowa House of Representatives, from the 84th district, first elected in 2002.  Democrat Elesha Gayman defeated him in the Iowa House of Representatives elections, 2006.  Van Fossen retired from the Davenport, Iowa police department in 2000 with the rank of Captain.  His son, Jamie Van Fossen, is also a former member of the Iowa House, from the 81st district.

During his final term in the Iowa House, Van Fossen served on several committees - the Judiciary Committee, the Natural Resources Committee, and the Public Safety Committee, where he was vice chair.  He also served on the Justice System Appropriations Subcommittee.

Electoral history
*incumbent

References

External links

 
 Van Fossen's Capitol Web Address

Republican Party members of the Iowa House of Representatives
Living people
1940s births
Politicians from Davenport, Iowa
American municipal police officers